In category theory, a branch of mathematics, a zero morphism is a special kind of morphism exhibiting properties like the morphisms to and from a zero object.

Definitions
Suppose C is a category, and f : X → Y is a morphism in C. The morphism f is called a constant morphism (or sometimes left zero morphism) if for any object W in C and any , fg = fh. Dually, f is called a coconstant morphism (or sometimes right zero morphism) if for any object Z in C and any g, h : Y → Z, gf = hf. A zero morphism is one that is both a constant morphism and a coconstant morphism.

A category with zero morphisms is one where, for every two objects A and B in C, there is a fixed morphism 0AB : A → B, and this collection of morphisms is such that for all objects X, Y, Z in C and all morphisms f : Y → Z, g : X → Y, the following diagram commutes:

The morphisms 0XY necessarily are zero morphisms and form a compatible system of zero morphisms.

If C is a category with zero morphisms, then the collection of 0XY is unique.

This way of defining a "zero morphism" and the phrase "a category with zero morphisms" separately is unfortunate, but if each hom-set has a ″zero morphism", then the category "has zero morphisms".

Examples

Related concepts
If C has a zero object 0, given two objects X and Y in C, there are canonical morphisms f : X → 0 and g : 0 → Y. Then, gf is a zero morphism in MorC(X, Y).  Thus, every category with a zero object is a category with zero morphisms given by the composition 0XY : X → 0 → Y.

If a category has zero morphisms, then one can define the notions of kernel and cokernel for any morphism in that category.

References
Section 1.7 of 
 .

Notes

Morphisms
0 (number)